Clayton Lee Brown (born September 20, 1958) is a former American football tight end. Brown was drafted in the second round by the Denver Broncos out of Brigham Young University in the 1981 NFL Draft.

External links
https://web.archive.org/web/20070929104809/http://www.databasefootball.com/players/playerpage.htm?ilkid=BROWNCLA02

1958 births
Living people
Players of American football from Los Angeles
American football tight ends
BYU Cougars football players
Atlanta Falcons players
Denver Broncos players
People from San Gabriel, California